Cyprinus micristius, the Dianchi carp, is a critically endangered species of ray-finned fish in the family Cyprinidae. It is found only in Lake Dianchi and its tributaries in Yunnan, China. The nominate subspecies from the lake itself has not been confirmed since the 1960s.

Sources

Cyprinus
Fish described in 1906
Taxonomy articles created by Polbot